The 6th Army was a field army unit of the German Wehrmacht during World War II (1939–1945). It was widely remembered for being the most highly decorated German army unit until its defeat by the Red Army at the Battle of Stalingrad in the winter of 1942–1943. It also acquired a reputation for the war crimes (such as the massacre of more than 30,000 Jews at Babi Yar in September 1941) that it committed under the command of Field Marshal Walther von Reichenau during Operation Barbarossa.

Western campaigns
Originally numbered as the 10th Army, this Army formed on 10 October 1939 with General Walther von Reichenau in command. Its primary mission was to guard the western defenses of Germany against British and French attacks during the Polish campaign. During the invasion of the Low Countries the 6th Army saw active service linking up with paratroopers and destroying fortifications at Eben Emael, Liège, and Namur during the Battle of Belgium. The 6th Army was then involved in the breakthrough of the Paris defences on 12 June 1940, before acting as a northern flank for German forces along the Normandy coast during the closing stages of the Battle of France.

War against the Soviet Union
The 6th Army took part in Operation Barbarossa as the spearhead of Army Group South. Reichenau died in an aircraft accident while being transported to a hospital after a heart attack in January 1942. He was succeeded by his former chief of staff, General Friedrich Paulus. Paulus led the 6th Army to a major victory at the Second Battle of Kharkov during the spring of 1942.

Battle of Stalingrad

On 28 June 1942, Army Group South began Fall Blau, the German Army's summer offensive into southern Russia. The goals of the operation were to secure both the oil fields at Baku, Azerbaijan, and the city of Stalingrad on the river Volga to protect the forces advancing into the Caucasus. After two months, the 6th Army reached the outskirts of Stalingrad on 23 August. On the same day, over 1,000 aircraft of the Luftflotte 4 bombed the city, killing many civilians.

Stalingrad was defended by the 62nd Army (Soviet Union) under the command of General Vasily Chuikov. Despite German air superiority over Stalingrad, and with more artillery pieces than the Red Army, progress was reduced to no more than several meters a day. Eventually, by mid November, the 62nd Army had been pushed to the banks of the Volga, but the 6th Army was unable to eliminate the remaining Soviet troops.

On 19 November the Stavka launched Operation Uranus, a major offensive by Soviet forces on the flanks of the German army. The first pincer attacked far to the west of the Don, with the second thrust beginning a day later attacking far to the south of Stalingrad. The 6th Army's flanks were protected by Romanian troops, who were quickly routed, and on 23 November, the pincers met at Kalach-na-Donu, thereby encircling the 6th Army. A relief attempt was launched on 12 December, codenamed Operation Winter Storm, but this failed. The army surrendered between 31 January and 2 February 1943. German casualties are 147,200 killed and wounded and over 91,000 captured, the latter including Field Marshal Paulus, 24 generals and 2,500 officers of lesser rank. Only 5,000 would return to Germany after the war.

Reformation
The army was reformed by renaming Armee-Abteilung Hollidt on 5 March 1943 under the command of General Karl-Adolf Hollidt. It later fought in Ukraine and Romania as part of Army Group South until transferred to Army Group A (later renamed to Army Group South Ukraine). In May 1944, the 6th Army became part of Army Group Dumitrescu, commanded by the Romanian general Petre Dumitrescu. The Army Group also included the Romanian 3rd Army. This instance marked the first time in the war when German commanders came under the actual (instead of nominal) command of their foreign allies. This came one month after Dumitrescu became the 5th non-German recipient of the Knight's Cross of the Iron Cross with Oak Leaves (4 April 1944). The 6th army was encircled and almost entirely destroyed during the Second Jassy–Kishinev Offensive carried out by the Soviets.

In October 1944, under the command of General Maximilian Fretter-Pico, the 6th Army encircled and destroyed three Soviet corps of Mobile Group Pliyev under the command of Issa Pliyev in the Battle of Debrecen. During this time, the 6th Army had the Hungarian Second Army placed under its command, and it was known as "Army Group Fretter-Pico" (Armeegruppe Fretter-Pico).

Command passed to General Hermann Balck on 23 December 1944. In December 1944, one of the 6th Army's subordinate units, the IX SS Mountain Corps, was encircled in Budapest. IV SS Panzer Corps was transferred to the 6th Army's command and a series of relief attempts, codenamed Operation Konrad, was launched during the 46-day-long Siege of Budapest.

After the failure of Konrad III, the 6th Army was made part of "Army Group Balck" (Armeegruppe Balck). This army group fell back to the area near Lake Balaton. Several units, including the III Panzer Corps, took part in Operation Spring Awakening, while the rest of the Sixth Army provided defence for the left flank of the offensive, in the region west of Székesfehérvár. After the failure of the offensive, the army held the line until the Soviet Vienna Offensive on 16 March 1945. This offensive tore a gap in the 6th Army between the IV SS Panzer Corps and the 3rd Hungarian Army (subordinated to Balck's command), shattering the formation. By the end of March 1945, the 6th Army was retreating towards Vienna. It surrendered to the U.S. Army on 9 May 1945.

Structure (as of October 1944)
 IV Panzer Corps
 LXXII Army Corps
 III Panzer Corps
 Hungarian II Army Corps
 Hungarian Group Flnta
 Army Reserve

War crimes

Bila Tserkva massacre
Soon after the beginning of Operation Barbarossa, the Sixth Army's surgeon, the staff doctor Gerhart Panning, learned about captured Russian expanding bullets by using Jewish POWs. To determine the effects of this type of ammunition on German soldiers, he decided to test them on other human beings after asking SD member and SS-Standartenführer Paul Blobel for some "guinea pigs" (Jewish POWs).

In July 1941 while conducting operations in Right-bank Ukraine, the Sixth Army bloodlessly captured the Ukrainian town of Bila Tserkva. Immediately after the town's capitulation, Sixth Army police units separated the Jewish population of the town into a ghetto and required that they wear the Star of David as identification. Two weeks after the occupation, members of Einsatzgruppen marched the Jews out of the town, 800 men and women in all, to be shot. The Sixth Army provided logistical support for this massacre, providing drivers, guards, weapons and ammunition. Afterwards ninety children aged twelve and under were left, their parents having been killed the night before. A staff officer with the division that made the town their headquarters wrote of their conditions:

Groscurth himself sought out the district commander and insisted that the execution must be stopped. Sixth Army headquarters was faced with a decision on what to do with the children left behind now that their parents had been murdered. The division commander passed the decision up to Walter von Reichenau, then commander of the Sixth Army, who personally authorized the massacre. All the children were murdered by Sixth Army regulars. Groscurth, appalled by the murders, wrote to his wife that "We cannot and should not be allowed to win this war".

Severity Order
The army's commander, Walther von Reichenau, a committed, fanatical Nazi, had this to say about the expected conduct of soldiers under his command. The order said, in part

— Conduct of Troops in Eastern Territories

Immediately after this order was issued, Sixth Army records show a dramatic increase in shootings, rapes and massacres committed by Sixth Army constituent units. The BBC upon examining the now released records of the Sixth Army, stated that there were "so many executions, and so many victims that it was impossible to keep them a secret."

The Sixth Army confiscated large quantities of food to be used by its troops, creating acute food shortages in the Ukraine. By January 1942, around one-third of the Kharkov's 300,000 remaining inhabitants suffered from starvation. Many would die in the cold winter months. Civilians survived the famine by making stews out of boiled leather and sawdust, and making omelets out of coagulated blood. Survivors bitterly remembered these "meals" for the rest of their lives.

Commanders
Commanding officers

Chief of staff

Footnotes

Bibliography

 
 
 
 
 
 

06
German units at the Battle of Stalingrad
Military units and formations established in 1939
Military units and formations disestablished in 1945
Babi Yar
Holocaust perpetrators in Ukraine